Koraput is a Lok Sabha parliamentary constituency in Odisha.

Assembly Segments
Assembly constituencies which constitute this parliamentary constituency are:

Members of Parliament

Election Result

2019 Election Result

2014 Election Result
In 2014 election, Biju Janata Dal candidate Jhina Hikaka defeated Indian National Congress candidate Giridhar Gamang by a margin of 19,328 votes.

General Election 2009

References

External links
Koraput lok sabha  constituency election 2019 date and schedule

Lok Sabha constituencies in Odisha
Koraput district
Rayagada district